Thank you for Being Late: an Optimist's Guide to Thriving in the Age of Accelerations is a non-fiction book written by Thomas Friedman, a Pulitzer Prize-winning New York Times columnist and author.

Contents

The book is divided into four parts - Reflecting, Accelerating, Innovating and Anchoring. When a friend arrived late for lunch, Friedman said, "Thank You for Being Late", as it gave him time to reflect, to listen to what was taking place around him and to slow down the pace. He begins by sharing a conversation with a fellow blogger, who also happened to be working as a parking attendant. The unlikely pair ended up spending time together as Friedman helped the blogger refine his process. This led to his own deeper reflection on defining his conceptual framework that underpinned his writing. He took a year's sabbatical to research and produce this book encapsulating what he discovered.

Reviews
John Micklethwait CBE, editor-in-chief of Bloomberg News, who reviewed Thank you for Being Late for The New York Times, wrote that this is Friedman's "most ambitious book — part personal odyssey, part common-sense manifesto". Friedman is a "self-confessed 'explanatory journalist' — whose goal is to be a 'translator from English to English' and this book is "a master class in explaining."

See also

That Used to Be Us
The World Is Flat
Hot, Flat, and Crowded
Radical center politics

References

2016 non-fiction books
Farrar, Straus and Giroux books